Nigel Wright may refer to:

Nigel Wright (boxer) (born 1979), English Boxer
Nigel Wright (record producer) (born 1955), English record producer
Nigel Wright (rugby league) (born 1973), English rugby league footballer fl. 1990s and 2000s
Nigel G. Wright (born 1949), British Baptist theologian
Nigel S. Wright (born 1963), Canadian businessman and lawyer, former Chief of Staff in the Canadian Prime Minister's Office
Nigel Wright (musician) (born 1993), American singer-songwriter and musician
Nigel Wright, perpetrator of the Tesco blackmail plot